The Timor cuckoo-dove (Macropygia magna) is a species of bird in the family Columbidae. It is found in Timor, Wetar and the eastern Lesser Sundas. It was previously lumped together with the Tanimbar cuckoo-dove and the Flores Sea cuckoo-dove as the dusky or bar-necked cuckoo-dove. It is rated as a species of least concern on the International Union for Conservation of Nature Red List of Endangered Species.

Status and conservation 
Since 1988, the Timor cuckoo-dove has been rated as a species of least concern on the IUCN Red List of Endangered Species. This is because although it has a restricted range, the range size is more than 20,000 km2 (7,700 mi2), and because it has a stable population trend. In addition, although its population numbers have not been determined, it is thought to be above 10,000, which is above the criterion to warrant a vulnerable rating. It is described to be rarely found on Timor, but commonly found on the Tanimbar Islands and on the Kalaotoa Island. It is thought to have no major threat.

References

 Ng, E.Y.X., J.A. Eaton, P. Verbelen, R.O. Hutchinson, and F.E. Rheindt. 2016. Using bioacoustic data to test species limits in an Indo-Pacific island radiation of Macropygia cuckoo doves. Biological Journal of the Linnean Society 118: 786–812.

Timor cuckoo-dove
Birds of Timor
Timor cuckoo-dove
Taxonomy articles created by Polbot